Wiktor Zieliński (born 11 January 2001) is a Polish professional pool player. He is the youngest player to ever win a Euro Tour event, winning the 2017 Treviso Open at the age of 16.

Career
Zielinski began playing pool at aged 8 in 2009, and in 2013 entered his first competition, the Junior European championships.
Zielinski played his first men's event in 2015, at the 2015 Italian Open. The following season, he won his first European championship. He won both the 9-ball and straight pool events at the European Youth Championships(under 16s). He defeated Fedor Gorst in the straight ball final 75–66, and Keskutis Zadeikis 7–5 in the 9-ball final. He won the junior straight pool championship again in 2017, whilst also finishing runner-up at the 9-ball and 8-ball events as well.

In 2017, aged 16, he became the youngest player to win an event on the Euro Tour, when he won the 2017 Treviso Open. Zielinski won the final over Mario He 9–1.
The same season, he reached the quarter-finals of the 2017 Portugal Open, and the last 16 at the 2017 Klagenfurt Open. He finished tenth on the rankings list at the end of the 2017 Euro Tour season. He later reached 4th in the Euro Tour rankings, in the 2018 season.

At the 2017 WPA World Nine-ball Championship, Zielinski lost his initial match to Cheng Yu-hsuan before winning his final match of the double elimination round against Mario He 9–8, to reach the knockout round. In the knockout round, Zielinski was defeated by David Alcaide 11–5. The following year at the 2018 event, Zielinski also lost his first match, before reaching the knockout round. In the knockout rounds, he defeated Tomasz Kapłan 11–4 and Johann Chua 11–5. Zielinski set up a last 16 match again Albin Ouschan, which he eventually lost 8–11.

Titles & achievements
 Pro Billiard Series
 Alfa Las Vegas Open (2022, 2023)
 Kamui Invitational Tournament (2022)
 Euro Tour 
 Treviso Open (2017)
 Treviso Open (2021)
 Lasko Open (2022)
 Polish Pool Championship
 Nine-Ball (2022)

References

External links

Polish pool players
Living people
2001 births
Competitors at the 2022 World Games